DOHaD China, a membership of the International Society for Developmental Origins of Health and Disease (an International Society for DOHaD), a non-profit organization, was set up in 2008 and made up of various scientists and clinicians (17 main council members), whose main research concentration is the developmental origins of health and disease.

External links
Official Website of International Society for Developmental Origins of Health and Disease
Official Website of DOHaD China

Medical and health organizations based in China